Chloe Chambers (born June 14, 2004) is an American racing driver. She is currently competing in the W Series for the Jenner Racing team.

Career

Formula 4 United States 
In 2021, Chambers competed in the Formula 4 United States Championship racing for Future Star Racing. She finished the season in 26th place.

W Series 
From 31 January 2022 to 4 February 2022, Chambers competed in a W Series test in Arizona, United States along with 14 other prospective drivers. She then participated in a second pre-season test in Barcelona on 2–4 March along with 11 other potential drivers and 9 automatic qualifiers from the previous W Series season. On 22 March 2022, Chambers was confirmed to compete in the 2022 W Series season racing for Jenner Racing alongside Jamie Chadwick. In the first race of the Miami double-header Chambers finished in 7th place, and was the best-placed rookie across the line. However, she was demoted to 14th after receiving a penalty for being out of position at the safety car line. In the second race, Chambers claimed her first W Series points finishing in 10th place and being the highest-placed rookie.

Racing record

Career summary

Complete Formula 4 United States Championship results 
(key) (Races in bold indicate pole position) (Races in italics indicate fastest lap)

Complete W Series results
(key) (Races in bold indicate pole position) (Races in italics indicate fastest lap)

Complete Formula Regional Oceania Championship Results
(key) (Races in bold indicate pole position) (Races in italics indicate fastest lap)

References

External links 
 Official website
 
 Profile at W Series

Living people
2004 births
W Series drivers
American female racing drivers
African-American sportswomen
Sportspeople from Guangdong
Toyota Racing Series drivers
United States F4 Championship drivers